Carex intumescens, also known as bladder sedge, is a species of Carex native to Canada and the eastern United States.

References

intumescens
Plants described in 1804
Flora of North America